The Representation of the People Act 2000 (c.2) is an Act of the Parliament of the United Kingdom that changed the British electoral process in four minor amendments to the Representation of the People Act 1983:
 It removed most restrictions on postal voting and proxy voting.
 It allows psychiatric hospitals to be used as a registration address.
 It requires additional assistance for disabled voters, particularly visually impaired voters.
 It made provision for new regulations governing the access, sale and supply of electoral registers.

Subsequent amendments
Six years after the act, the Department for Constitutional Affairs introduced the Bill that became the Electoral Administration Act 2006  which made alterations to UK electoral processes.

See also
 Reform Acts
Representation of the People Act

External links
The Representation of the People Act 2000, as currently amended
The Representation of the People Act 2000, as originally enacted from the Office of Public Sector Information.
Explanatory notes to the Representation of the People Act 2000 from the Office of Public Sector Information.

United Kingdom Acts of Parliament 2000
Representation of the People Acts